Mudaliar, also spelled as Mudaliyar, Muthaliyar, Mudali, and Moodley, is a surname used by the Tamil people. It is derived from the honorary title Mudali meaning a person of first rank in the Tamil language, which was bestowed upon top-ranking bureaucratic officials, philanthropists, educationists, physicians, politicians and army officers in medieval south India.

The following is a list of people that have used Mudaliar surname.

Historical personalities

Poets
Andaka Kaviviraraghava Mudaliar: A poet of the 16th century

Chieftains and ministers
Vallal Sadaiyappa Mudaliar: 12th Century velir: Lived Puducherry: and Thiruvenainallur: in Tamil Nadu. Patron of Tamil Poet Kambar: who created Kamba Ramayanam:
Chandramathi Mudaliar: was a 17th-century Tamil chieftain and ruler of south Kongu Nadu (Erode region) who fought many battles against the Telugu Madurai Nayak. Erode Fort was built by him.
Ariyanatha Mudaliar: Vellala Dalavoy of the Vijayanagar viceroy Viswanatha Nayaka.

Modern personalities

Social leaders, activists
S. P. Ayyaswamy Mudaliar,  His house Gandhi Peak in Royapettah,Chennai hosted many INC meetings and Netaji.
C. Jambulingam Mudaliar, Indian politician and freedom-fighter who served as a civil court judge and member of the Madras Legislative Council
Muthuranga Mudaliar,Freedom-fighter from Nasarath pettai near Poonamallee in Thiruvallur District. He participated in the Quit India Movement in 1942
Sarojini Varadappan, Social worker in women welfare and empowerment, awarded Padma Shri 1971 and Padma Bhushan in 2009.

Tamil literature
Vethagiri Mudaliar: Tamil scholar, published Tirukkural with commentaries for the first time.
A. Singaravelu Mudaliar:Compiled a Tamil encyclopedia entitled Apitana Cintamani.
Makaral Karthikeya Mudaliar: Tamil scholar
Pa. Subramania Mudaliar: Tamil scholar
Mahavidwan Vasudeva Mudaliar: Tamil scholar
Thandavarayar Mudaliyar, Tamil enthusiast, translated panchatanra from maratha language

Philanthropists
Rao Bahadur M. Jambulingam Mudaliar, Philanthropist from Cuddalore who was donator of 620 acres land to Neyveli lignite corporation.
Nachimuthu Mudaliar, a philanthropist from Chennimalai. He was the founder of Chentex weavers co-operative society in which thousands of weavers benefited and he was a Padma Shree awardee. He was former president of Senguntha Mahajana Sangam.
K. A. Shanmuga Mudaliar: ex MLA and Chairman of Tirupattur. Founder of Government Thirumagal Mill's College
Pachaiyappa Mudaliar, Philanthropist after whom the Pachaiyappa's College, Pachiyappa's Trust Board, Chennai was named.
V. L. Ethiraj, Philanthropist who donated his life savings and founded the Ethiraj College for Women.
Raja Sir Ramaswamy Mudaliar: Philanthropist who endowed a hospital and dispensary in the Native infirmary
Arcot Narrainsawmy Mudaliar, Philanthropist who founded the R.B.A.N.M.'s Educational Charities and R.B.A.N.M.'s Chattram and other Charities.

Politics

C. Natesa Mudaliar: One of the founders of Justice Party
P. T. Rajan, Former Chief Minister of Madras Presidency and Former President of Justice Party
C. N. Annadurai, Fourth and last Chief Minister of Madras State and the First Chief Minister of Tamil Nadu, Founder of Dravida Munnetra Kazhagam
M. Bhaktavatsalam, 4th Chief Minister of Madras State
Arcot Ramasamy Mudaliar, Indian lawyer, politician and statesman
V. K. Ramaswami Mudaliar, Indian politician, ex  opposition leader Legislative Assembly.
C. Gopal Mudaliyar former MLA and MP.
M. R. Kandasamy Mudaliar first MLA of Veerapandi
A. Mariappan Mudaliar: freedom Fighter and former MLA
C. S. Ratnasabhapathy Mudaliar, Father of Modern Coimbatore
S. Muthiah Mudaliar, Minister of Education (1928–1830).
C. Muttukumarasami Mudaliyar, Indian politician and hereditary zamindar of Chunampet. Member of the Madras Legislative Council 1904-7
R. N. Arogyasamy Mudaliar: an Indian civil engineer and politician who served as the Minister of Development in the Madras Presidency from 1926 to 1928
A. M. Ponnuranga Mudaliar: Former MLA of Sholinghur constituency, INC
 C. Ramaswamy Mudaliar (1905–1997), Indian politician from Indian National Congress. Member of Lok Sabha for Kumbakonam from 1951 to 1957.
S. J. Ramaswamy Mudali: textile merchant and Former MLA of Arakkonam and Sholinghur constituency.
A. Ranganatha Mudaliar: Indian politician and theosophist from Bellary, first Commissioner of the Thirumala-Tirupathi devasthanam board from 1935 to 1939.
S. C. Sadayappa Mudaliar: textile merchant, freedom fighter and Former Afakkonam MLA.
S. V. Natesa Mudaliar: Former INC MLA from Kanchipuram, Famous for defeating former chief minister C.N Annadurai.
P. T. R. Palanivel Rajan, 9th Speaker of the Tamil Nadu Legislative Assembly and Former Minister for Hindu Religious and Charitable Endowments, Government of Tamil Nadu
A. R. Subbiah Mudaliar: Tamil Nadu politician
C. P. Subbiah Mudaliar: freedom fighter and former MLA of Coimbatore. 
Muniswamy Mudaliar: Fiji Indian politician
O. V. Alagesa Mudaliar: freedom fighter and Tamil Nadu politician, India's Ambassador to Ethiopia from 1968 to 1971.
Palanivel Thiagarajan, Minister for Finance and Human Resources Management, Government of Tamil Nadu

Civil service and judiciary
S. Muthiah Mudaliar, High Court lawyer and politician, Justice party
 Arcot Ramasamy Mudaliar, Mayor of Madras (1928–30), Vice Chancellor of University of Kerala (1951–61), leader of the Justice Party politician, member of Winston Churchill's war cabinet, first President of ECOSOC and Founder of WHO, founding Chairman of ICICI Bank, Diwan of Mysore; awarded Padma Vibushan
Kanakaraya Mudali, Chief dubash and a broker for the French East India Company
Salem Ramaswami Mudaliar, Indian lawyer, politician and Indian independence activist.
S. Mohan, Former Judge of the Supreme Court of India and Former Acting Governor of Karnataka.
R. Sudhakar, Former Chief Justice of the Manipur High Court.
M. Sathyanarayanan, Former Judge of the Madras High Court.

Sports
Mangalam Chinnaswamy Mudaliar, Founder Karnataka Cricket Association, President BCCI, M. Chinnaswamy Stadium in Bangalore is named after him.
C. D. Gopinath, Former Indian Test cricketer.

Arts and cinema
Papanasa Mudaliar, Carnatic music composer
Pammal Sambandha Mudaliar, playwright and director of Tamil drama
R. Nataraja Mudaliar, pioneer in the production of silent films
Alarmel Valli, Classical dancer, teacher and choreographer, exponent of the Pandanallur style, of the classical dance form of Bharatanatyam, awarded Padma Shri in 1991 and Padma Bhushan in 2004.
Meenakshi Chitharanjan, Classical dancer, teacher and choreographer, exponent of the Pandanallur style of the classical dance form of Bharatanatyam, awarded Padma Shri in 2008.
Anandaraj, Tamil actor

Educationists, Doctors, scientists and academicians
A. Lakshmanaswami Mudaliar, first Indian Principal of the Madras Medical College and longest-serving Vice Chancellor of the University of Madras; Chairman of UNESCO;First chairman IIT MADRAS ,awarded Padma Vibhushan for Medicine, 1963.
 Guruswami Mudaliar, first Indian to be appointed Professor of Therapeutics at the Madras Medical College, first Dean of Madras Medical college
 A.Shanmukha Mudaliar Professor of Samskrit, Head of Depatment of Samskrit - Pachiyappa’s College, Chennai. Co-Founder - Kuppuswamy Sastri Research Institute. Mylapore.
N. D. Sundaravadivelu, Former Vice Chancellor, University of Madras
C. Tadulinga Mudaliar, Indian botanist, Former Mayor of Madras
Munirathna Anandakrishnan, Former Vice-Chancellor, Anna University, Chennai and Former Chairman, IIT Kanpur, awarded Padma Shri in 2002.
Mylswamy Annadurai, Scientist, known as Moon Man of India, awarded Padma Shri in 2016.
V. M. Muralidharan, Chairman of the Ethiraj College for Women
Aswath Damodaran, Professor of Finance at the Stern School of Business, New York University
S. Kameswaran, ENT surgeon, awarded Padma Shri in 1990.
Thanikachalam Sadagopan, Cardiologist, awarded Padma Shri in 2009.
Sivapatham Vittal, Surgical endocrinologist, considered by many as the Father of Surgical Endocrinology in India, awarded Padma Shri in 2011. 
Mohan Kameswaran, Otorhinolaryngologist, awarded Padma Shri in 2006.

Miscellaneous
 Varadarajan Mudaliar, Bombay based don known as Vardha Bhai; the Tamil movie Nayakan was based on his life story
 Raja Mudaliar, richest trader in Malacca during the early 16th century

References

Tamil society
Lists of people by surname